The Batten Kill, Battenkill, or Battenkill River is a  river rising in Vermont that flows into New York and is a tributary of the Hudson River. It is the longest Hudson tributary on that river's east.  As "kill" means a creek, the name "Battenkill River" is pleonastic.

The mouth of the Batten Kill is in Easton, New York, and the source of the river is in East Dorset, Vermont.

The river is known for its fishing, as it has a prominent trout population. The Shushan Covered Bridge crosses it at one point, and the headquarters of the Orvis Corporation are also located along its course.

The Batten Kill valley is home to the Tour of the Battenkill, the largest road cycling race in North America.

The Native American name for the river is either Dionoondehowee or Ondawa.

Tributaries
 Mad Tom Brook
 Bourn Brook
 Lye Brook
 Mill Brook
 Warm Brook
 Green River
 Camden Creek
 Black Creek
 Whittaker Brook
 Hartshorn Brook

Course
The Batten Kill rises in East Dorset, Vermont, and flows south, with Mad Tom Brook soon joining it from the southern slope of Mount Tabor. It flows in a southwesterly direction to Arlington and then in a westerly direction, entering New York. The river continues west, forming the boundary between the towns of Jackson and Salem, turning north at the hamlet of Shushan. Turning west again at Greenwich Junction, the river becomes the boundary between Jackson and the town of Greenwich, passing the hamlets of East Greenwich, Battenville and Center Falls before reaching the village of Greenwich. The Batten Kill continues as the boundary between Greenwich and the town of Easton, past the hamlet of Middle Falls and ends at the Hudson River, at a point one mile (1.6 km) north of Schuylerville.

From source to mouth following the major windings, the river measures .

Watershed

The Vermont portion of the Batten Kill watershed is mountainous, steep and heavily forested. The tributaries are, for the most part, wooded, steep and narrow. National Forest Service land in this watershed is almost . The following river and tributary descriptions for the Vermont portion of the basin were taken in part from the United States Geological Survey publication Surface Waters of Vermont.

It flows southward and south-westward to East Dorset where it joins the beginning of the Batten Kill from the north.

Camden Creek flows south to southwest from its source, just east of the New York state line, near West Sandgate. A little less than one mile south of its source, it is joined by Terry Brook, which flows in from the east. The creek runs south-southwest through the Camden Valley, crossing into Washington County, New York. It is joined by West Camden Creek from the north about one quarter mile from its junction with the Batten Kill on the north side of NY State Route 313, east of the hamlet of Shushan.

Covered bridges
The Batten Kill is crossed by four covered bridges, three of which are still in use today: West Arlington Bridge, Vermont (1852), Eagleville Bridge, New York (1858), Shushan Covered Bridge, New York (1858–1962), and Rexleigh Covered Bridge, New York (1874). The Shushan Covered Bridge is now a seasonal museum.

Agriculture
Sheldon Farms (1845)

Battle of Saratoga
The Batten Kill was supposed to be a fallback point for the British General Burgoyne's forces, but was never used and thus did not play a significant role in the battle.

See also 
 List of rivers of New York
 List of rivers of Vermont

References

External links
 
 Fly fishing the Battenkill River, at FlyfishingConnection
 Batten Kill River — Trout Fishing Profile, at GORP
 The Batten Kill Watershed Alliance

Rivers of New York (state)
Rivers of Vermont
Tributaries of the Hudson River
Rivers of Washington County, New York
Rivers of Bennington County, Vermont